Robert Michael Ridley (born 8 January 1947) is a former English first-class cricketer.

Ridley was born at Oxford in January 1947. He was later educated at Clifton College, before going up to St Edmund Hall, Oxford. While studying at Oxford, Ridley made his debut in first-class cricket for Oxford University against Worcestershire at Oxford in 1967. The following year, he found himself playing a first-class match for Ireland against the Marylebone Cricket Club at Dublin. He continued to play first-class cricket for Oxford University until 1970, making a total of 22 first-class appearances for the university. He scored a total of 944 runs in his matches for Oxford, at an average of 24.20, with a highest score of 79. One of eight first-class half centuries he made, this score came against Leicestershire in 1968. He later played minor counties cricket for Berkshire from 1972–1973. Outside of cricket, Ridley worked as a schoolteacher, eventually becoming headmaster of Denstone College, and later the Royal Belfast Academical Institution.

References

External links

1947 births
Living people
Cricketers from Oxford
People educated at Clifton College
Alumni of St Edmund Hall, Oxford
English cricketers
Oxford University cricketers
Ireland cricketers
Berkshire cricketers
Schoolteachers from Oxfordshire
Heads of schools in England